Project E-Pana is a Royal Canadian Mounted Police (RCMP) task force created in 2005 with the purpose of solving cases of missing and murdered persons along a section of Highway 16, all female, between Prince Rupert, British Columbia and Prince George, British Columbia, dubbed the Highway of Tears. Though it started with the scope of investigating victims of Highway 16, within a year of formation, it morphed to include victims along Highways 5, 24 and 97.  It is no longer specifically dedicated to Highway of Tears cases.

Origins 
The name E-Pana was chosen from a concatenation of E from "E" Division, which is the RCMP division that has jurisdiction over British Columbia (BC), and Pana, which is the name of an Inuit goddess who cares for souls before heaven or reincarnation.

The task force was created during the Fall of 2005 in order to investigate a series of unsolved murders and disappearances along BC's Highway of Tears, and determine whether a serial killer or killers is operating there. In 2006, the Task Force took ownership of nine investigations. In 2007 the number of cases doubled from nine to eighteen.

The criteria for case selection was changed around this time to more precisely define E-Pana victims.

E-Pana consists of 13 murder investigations and 5 disappearances, ranging in date from 1969 to 2006.

Victims list 
Thirteen of the eighteen victims on the E-Pana list were teenagers; ten of aboriginal descent.

The following criteria must be met by the victims in order to be added to the E-Pana list:

 The victim was female;
 The victim was engaged in one or more 'high risk' behaviours, i.e., behaviours which would tend to place them in the control of strangers in isolated environments without witnesses (e.g. outside the sight and earshot of the bystanders), easy avenues of escape or sources of assistance – primary examples of this would be hitchhiking alone or sex work;
 The victim went missing from, or her body was found near, Highway 16 from Prince Rupert to Hinton, Highway 97 from Merritt to Fort Nelson, or Highways 5 and 24 connecting Valemount and 100 Mile House; and,
 The evidence indicated a stranger attack, i.e., no suspect was seen or identifiable and there was no grounds to believe that death was the result of suicide, misadventure or domestic violence.

Suspects and convictions 
Investigators are confident that a single serial killer is not responsible for all of the E-PANA investigations. To date only one suspect has been charged in any of the E-Pana cases, Garry Taylor Handlen. Handlen was charged with the murder of 12 year old Monica Jack. Bobby Jack Fowler is believed through DNA evidence to have been responsible for the murder of Colleen MacMillen, but died in prison before charges could be laid. Fowler is also the prime suspect in the murders of Gale Weys and Pamela Darlington.

On September 25, 2012, the RCMP announced a link between the murders and Fowler. His supposed DNA was found on the body of Colleen MacMillen, one of the presumed victims. Investigators first compiled a DNA profile of the perpetrator in 2007, but technology available at the time did not yield a strong enough sample. New technologies allowed police to re-examine the DNA in 2012, leading to the identification. In addition, Fowler is also strongly suspected of having killed both Gale Weys and Pamela Darlington in 1973. The RCMP believe that he may have also killed as many as ten or possibly even twenty of the other victims. Several of the E-Pana murders took place after Fowler's arrest in June 1995.

In December 2014, a serial rapist named Garry Taylor Handlen was charged with the murders of Monica Jack and 11-year-old Kathryn-Mary Herbert. Police said that Handlen was previously a suspect, but they had not had enough evidence to charge him. According to CBC, the RCMP said that the December 2014 arrest was attributed in part to advances in forensic science, but the specific details were not released. Handlen was convicted on 17 January 2019, for the first degree murder of Monica Jack. The Crown prosecution's case was based largely upon Handlen's confession which was extracted as part of a Mr. Big sting operation.

None of the solved E-Pana cases involve victims that were found or taken near the Highway of Tears.

Funding and resources 
In the 2009/2010 year, E-Pana received over five million dollars in annual funding but has since dramatically declined due to budget cutbacks; receiving only $806,109 for the 2013/2014 year. In 2013, Craig Callens, the RCMP Deputy Commissioner, warned that further budget reductions from the provincial government would greatly affect investigations. A 2014 Freedom of Information request stated that the task force had dropped from seventy officers to twelve officers since 2010.

See also 
 List of people who disappeared

References 

Royal Canadian Mounted Police
Divisions and units of the Royal Canadian Mounted Police
Crime in British Columbia
Highway of Tears
Missing people
Missing person cases in Canada